Jeremiah B. Bloom (May 25, 1913 – October 2, 1983) was an American lawyer and politician from New York.

Biography
He was born on May 25, 1913, in New York City. He attended Brooklyn Evening Technical High School. He graduated from St. John's University and St. John's University School of Law. During World War II he served in the U.S. Navy as a chief petty officer. He married Dorothy , and they had one son.

Bloom was a member of the New York City Council from 1950 to 1957.

He was a member of the New York State Senate from 1958 to 1978, sitting in the 171st, 172nd, 173rd, 174th, 175th, 176th, 177th, 178th, 179th, 180th, 181st and 182nd New York State Legislatures. In 1978, he challenged Hugh Carey in the Democratic primary for Governor of New York, but was defeated.

In 1980, he supported Republican Ronald Reagan for U.S. President.

He died on October 2, 1983, in St. Clare's Hospital in Manhattan, after a heart attack at the Port Authority Bus Terminal; and was buried at Mount Lebanon Cemetery in Glendale, Queens.

Sources

External links

1913 births
1983 deaths
Democratic Party New York (state) state senators
Politicians from Brooklyn
Military personnel from New York City
St. John's University School of Law alumni
New York City Council members
20th-century American politicians